The 2004 World Junior Ice Hockey Championships (2004 WJHC) was held between December 26, 2003, and January 5, 2004, in Helsinki and Hämeenlinna, Finland. The United States won their first ever gold medal, defeating Canada 4–3 in the final.

Venues

Rosters

Top Division

Preliminary round

Group A

All times local (EET/UTC+2).

Group B

All times local (EET/UTC+2).

Relegation round
Results from any games played during the preliminary round were carried forward to the relegation round.

(all games at Hämeenlinna)

January 2
Sweden 4–0 Ukraine
Switzerland 6–2 Austria

January 3
Austria 2–2 Ukraine
Sweden 4–3 Switzerland

Playoff round

Quarterfinals

Semifinals

Fifth place game

Bronze medal game

Final

The victory gave the United States its first WJC gold medal ever, and its first medal since a silver medal in 1997 when it lost 2–0 to Canada in the final.

Scoring leaders
GP = Games played; G = Goals; A = Assists; Pts = Points; +/− = Plus-minus; PIM = Penalties In Minutes

Goaltending leaders
Minimum 40% of team's ice time.

Tournament awards

Most Valuable Player
 Zach Parise

Final standings

Division I
The Division I Championships were played on December 14–20, 2003 in Berlin, Germany (Group A) and on December 13–19, 2003 in Briançon, France (Group B).

Group A

Group B

Division II
The Division II Championships were played on December 28, 2003 – January 3, 2004 in Sosnowiec, Poland (Group A) and on January 5–11, 2004 in Kaunas and Elektrėnai, Lithuania (Group B).

Group A

Group B

Division III
The Division III Championship was played on January 5–11, 2004 in Sofia, Bulgaria.

References

 
World Junior Ice Hockey Championships
World Junior Ice Hockey Championships
World junior championships
2004
International sports competitions in Helsinki
World Junior Ice Hockey Championships
World Junior Ice Hockey Championships
Sport in Hämeenlinna
World Junior Ice Hockey Championships, 2004
World Junior championships
International ice hockey competitions hosted by Germany
Sports competitions in Berlin
World Junior championships
International ice hockey competitions hosted by France
World Junior championships
World Junior championships
Sports competitions in Kaunas
World Junior Ice Hockey Championships, 2004
International ice hockey competitions hosted by Lithuania
Sport in Elektrėnai
Sports competitions in Sofia
World Junior Ice Hockey Championships, 2004
World Junior championships
International ice hockey competitions hosted by Bulgaria
International ice hockey competitions hosted by Poland